G protein-activated inward rectifier potassium channel 2 is a protein that in humans is encoded by the KCNJ6 gene. Mutation in KCNJ6 gene has been proposed to be the cause of Keppen-Lubinsky Syndrome (KPLBS).

Function 

Potassium channels are present in most mammalian cells, where they participate in a wide range of physiologic responses. The protein encoded by this gene is an integral membrane protein and inward-rectifier type potassium channel. The encoded protein, which has a greater tendency to allow potassium to flow into a cell rather than out of a cell, is controlled by G-proteins and may be involved in the regulation of insulin secretion by glucose. It associates with two other G-protein-activated potassium channels to form a heteromultimeric pore-forming complex.

Interactions 

KCNJ6 has been shown to interact with KCNJ9 and DLG1.

See also
 G protein-coupled inwardly-rectifying potassium channel
 Inward-rectifier potassium ion channel

References

Further reading

External links 
 
 

Ion channels